Love The Noise was the first full-length record released by the indie rock band Camera Can't Lie.  It was re-released in 2006 and remixed by Matt Goldman (Copeland, Cartel).  Songs off the album received strong air-time on Midwest indie radio stations.

Track listing
 "Forever" - 3:57
 "One Last Sunset" - 4:12
 "My Revelation" - 3:59
 "Theme from Chapter Thirteen" - 5:30
 "Stories In a Star" - 3:21
 "To: the Desire for Perseverance" - 3:56
 "Being Broken Is a Beautiful Thing" - 1:31
 "A Helpful Imperfection" - 3:23
 "Still Sweet Silence" - 4:34
 "Nights Turned Day" - 4:22
 "Love the Noise" - 4:16

References

2005 debut albums
Camera Can't Lie albums